Filip Ahl (born 12 June 1997) is a Swedish professional ice hockey forward who is currently playing for Orli Znojmo of the 2nd Czech Republic Hockey League. He was chosen in the 2015 NHL Entry Draft by the Ottawa Senators.

Playing career
Ahl made his Swedish Hockey League debut playing with HV71 during the 2013–14 SHL season. At 16 years of age, Ahl became the youngest player to ever appear with HV71, the ninth youngest in SHL history. Following the 2014–15 season, Ahl was signed to a two-year contract extension by HV71 on May 8, 2015.

In 2016, Ahl came to Canada to play one season with the Regina Pats junior team. Ahl had a good season, scoring 28 goals and 48 total points and the Pats team made it to the WHL finals. Ahl attended the Senators' development camp in the summer, but Ahl did not sign with the Senators and signed instead with Örebro HK. The Senators retain his NHL rights for one more season, when he can become a free agent.

Un-signed from the Senators, Ahl left Örebro HK after the 2017–18 season, signing a one-year contract with second tier club, Tingsryds AIF of the Allsvenskan, on 1 May 2018.

Career statistics

Regular season and playoffs

International

References

External links

1997 births
Living people
Asplöven HC players
Bofors IK players
Swedish expatriate ice hockey players in Canada
HV71 players
IF Sundsvall Hockey players
Örebro HK players
Ottawa Senators draft picks
Sportspeople from Jönköping
Regina Pats players
Swedish ice hockey forwards
Tingsryds AIF players
Bratislava Capitals players
Orli Znojmo players
Swedish expatriate sportspeople in the Czech Republic
Swedish expatriate sportspeople in Slovakia
Swedish expatriate sportspeople in Italy
Expatriate ice hockey players in Italy
Expatriate ice hockey players in the Czech Republic
Expatriate ice hockey players in Slovakia